Below are the squads for the 2019 AFF U-22 Youth Championship, which takes place between  17 to 26 February 2019.

Group A

Thailand 
Head coach:  Alexandre Gama

The final squad was announced on 4 February 2019.

Philippines 
Head coach:  Salvador Salvacion

The final squad was announced on 15 February 2019.

Timor-Leste 
Head coach:  Norio Tsukitate

Vietnam 
Head coach:  Nguyễn Quốc Tuấn

The final squad was announced on 14 February 2019.

Group B

Cambodia 
Head coach:  Félix Dalmás

Myanmar 
Head coach:  Velizar Popov

The final squad was announced on 14 February 2019.

Malaysia 
Head coach:  Ong Kim Swee

The final squad was announced on 14 February 2019.

Indonesia 
Head coach:  Indra Sjafri

The final squad was announced on 13 February 2019.

References 

AFF U-22 Youth Championship